Hubert Work (July 3, 1860December 14, 1942) was a U.S. administrator and physician. He served as the United States Postmaster General from 1922 until 1923 during the presidency of Warren G. Harding. He served as the United States Secretary of the Interior from 1923 until 1928 during the administrations of Warren G. Harding and Calvin Coolidge.

Early life and career
Work was born in Marion Center, Pennsylvania, to Tabitha Van Horn and Moses Thompson Work. He attended medical school at the University of Michigan from 1882 to 1883 and received an M.D. from the University of Pennsylvania in 1885. He settled in Colorado and founded Woodcroft Hospital in Pueblo, Colorado, in 1896.

Work was active in the Republican Party and served as the Colorado state chairman in 1912. In 1914, Work ran unsuccessfully in a special election for the United States Senate. He was defeated by Democrat Charles S. Thomas, later the governor of Colorado.

Work received 98,728 votes (39 percent) compared to Thomas' 102,037 ballots (40.3 percent).  This was Colorado's first Senate election by popular vote under the Seventeenth Amendment to the United States Constitution.  During World War I, Work served in the U.S. Army Medical Corps and attained the rank of lieutenant colonel.

From 1921 to 1922, Work served as the president of the American Medical Association. He was the Colorado delegate to the Republican National Convention in 1920 and was chairman of the Republican National Committee from 1928 to 1929.

Work served as the U.S. Assistant Postmaster General from 1921 to 1922, and as the U.S. Postmaster General from 1922 to 1923 under President Harding.  He served as the U.S. Secretary of the Interior from 1923 to 1928, under the administrations of President Warren G. Harding and Calvin Coolidge.  During Work's tenure as the Secretary of the Interior, American citizenship was formally granted to the Native Americans in the United States.  He resigned from the Department of the Interior on July 24, 1928, and was replaced by Roy O. West.  He was the first physician to serve in the U.S. Cabinet.

Personal life
In 1887, Work married Laura M. Arbuckle (18591924), with whom he had three children: Philip, Dorcas "Doris" Logan, and Robert Van Horn Work. Work's first wife died and he married the former Ethel Reed Gano in 1933.

Work died in Denver, Colorado, on December 14, 1942. He was buried in Arlington National Cemetery in Arlington, Virginia, next to his first wife.

References

External links

Hubert Work biography at americanpresident.org
Photographs of Hubert Work's Gravestone
Hubert Work papers at the Hoover Institution Archives
Psychiatry Dr. Hubert Work, School of Medicine Faculty Profiles: 1883-1933, University of Colorado Anschutz Medical Campus https://library-cuanschutz.libguides.com/ld.php?content_id=54060112

|-

|-

|-

1860 births
1942 deaths
Colorado Republican Party chairs
Colorado Republicans
People from Indiana County, Pennsylvania
People from Pueblo, Colorado
Republican National Committee chairs
United States Postmasters General
United States Secretaries of the Interior
Burials at Arlington National Cemetery
Harding administration cabinet members
20th-century American politicians
Coolidge administration cabinet members
Physicians from Colorado
United States Army Medical Corps officers
United States Army personnel of World War I
University of Michigan Medical School alumni
Presidents of the American Medical Association